The Top 25 Canadian Immigrant Awards is an annual campaign by Canadian Immigrant magazine that recognizes outstanding work by immigrants who "have come to Canada and have made a positive difference living in the country."

Overview 
First launched by Canadian Immigrant in 2009, the program takes place online and nominations are open to all Canadians. The program is divided into three phases: nominations, voting and winners announcements. At the start of each year, Canadian Immigrant invites nominations based on a variety of criteria, which range from contribution to community to professional accomplishments. The award is open to immigrants from all walks of life, be it a community advocate or volunteer, a successful entrepreneur or a cultural icon. A judging panel composed of leaders who work within the immigrant or ethnic communities determine the shortlist on which the public vote.

The winners are featured online and in a special issue each year. Past winners include Vancouver Organizing Committee for the 2010 Olympic and Paralympic Winter Games CEO John Furlong, CBC News anchor Ian Hanomansing, Canada's 26th Governor General Adrienne Clarkson, entrepreneur/philanthropist Aditya Jha and mental health activist Loizza Aquino.

Award recipients

2022 
Recipients in 2022 include:

 Tosin Ajibola
 Damineh Akhavan
 Patrick Alcedo
 Minister Omar Alghabra
 Anil Arora
 Mariam Bilgrami
 Karla Briones
 Rita Chahal
 Diana Alli D’Souza
 Tracy Folorunsho-Barry
 Raquel Fox
 Dr. Sivakumar Gulasingam
 John Herdman
 Dr. Akshay Jain
 Bhutila Karpoche
 Mohamed Lachemi, PhD
 Paul Sun-Hyung Lee
 Leen Li
 Arnon Melo
 Roda Muse
 Amie Peacock
 Janaka Ruwanpura, PhD
 Harman Singh
 Ruairi Spillane
 Rui Wang, PhD

2021 
Recipients in 2021 include:

 Luis Carlos Flores Aguilar
 Lanre Ajayi
 Gentille M. Assih
 Ida Beltran-Lucila
 Tulia Castellanos
 Hon. Justice Mahmud Jamal
 Dr. Victoria Lee
 Indra Maharjan
 Ginella Massa
 Paola Murillo
 Edsel Mutia
 Leon Ng
 Rita Orji
 Gurdeep Pandher
 Ajay Patel
 Shreya Patel
 Jack Rabba
 Bukola Salami
 Dr. Pere Santamaria
 Anil Shah
 Sonia Sidhu
 Zen Tharani
 Boris Tsimerinov
 Hassan Wadi
 Jaclyn (Jie) Zhang

2020 
Recipients in 2020 include:

 Ajibola Abitoye
 Shahab Anari
 Samer Bishay
 Serena Chan
 Kanwar Dhanjal
 Sharmarke Dubow
 Isaac Garcia-Sitton
 Virginia Guiang-Santoro
 Tareq Hadhad
 Basavaraj Halli
 Hamza Haq
 Mike Hurley
 Dr. Shanthi Johnson
 Meryam Joobeur
 Conny Lo
 Jakub Martinec
 Adeola Olubamiji
 Fariba Pacheleh
 Bruce Poon Tip
 Dr. Henry Reis
 Arlene Ruiz
 Krishana Sankar
 Harsh Thakkar
 Dr. Halia M. Valladares Montemayor
 Maryam Yaqoob

2019 
Recipients in 2019 include:

 Mohd Jamal Alsharif
 Javier Badillo
 Selwyn Collaco
 Rola Dagher
 Monika Deol
 Tulsi Dharel
 Krittika D'Silva
 Rouba Fattal
 Ali Ghorbani
 Giacomo Gianniotti
 Devesh Gupta
 Devina Kaur
 Nizar Ladak
 Philip Lee
 Marquis Lung
 Iqbal Malek
 Sam Mod
 Brenda Okorogba
 Maryam Sadeghi
 Gelaine Santiago
 Wali Shah
 Kimberlee Shelley-Ajibolade
 Jane Shin
 Dr. Nhung Tran-Davies
 Samra Zafar

2018 
Recipients in 2018 include:

 Margaret Adu
 Pooneh Alizadeh
 Mohammed Alsaleh
 Loizza Aquino
 Sara Asalya
 Harbhajan Singh Athwal
 Nav Bhatia
 Roberto Campanella
 Kundan Joshi
 Isabel Kanaan
 Dr. Raj Khanuja
 Sophie Lavieri
 Kin Wah Leung
 Tinashe Mafukidze
 Prof. Dr. Mario Monteiro
 Dr. Saroj Niraula
 Dr. Boluwaji Ogunyemi
 Senator Ratna Omidvar
 Bernardo Riveros
 Priti Shah
 Naseem Somani
 Karl Subban
 Josephine Victoria Yam
 Rana Zaman
 Jianhua Zhu

2017 
Recipients in 2017 include:

 Ishita Aggarwal
 Dr. Zulfiqar Bhutta
 Gabriela Covaci
 Dahlia ElShafie-Mostafa
 Mohamad Fakih
 Jennifer Gillivan
 Chan Hon Goh
 Raghwa Gopal
 Maziar Heidari
 Minister Ahmed Hussen
 Abdullah Kafashe
 Tony Luk
 Trish Mandewo
 Florfina Marcelino
 Noelle Milne
 Agnes P. Miranda
 Dr. Muhammad Morshed
 Dr. James Orbinski
 Shahrzad Rafati
 Ahmad Danny Ramadan
 Miroslav Reljic
 Ninela Sanchez
 Kuldeep Sharma
 Ajay Virmani
 Senator Yuen Pau Woo

2016 
Recipients in 2016 include:

 Kiran Ahluwalia
 Leen Al Zaibak
 Godwin Chan
 Tilak Chawan
 Queenie Choo
 Igor Dobrovolskiy
 Emma Donoghue
 Josephine Etowa
 Chandran Fernando
 Azita Haddadi
 Narmin Ismail
 Christians Izquierdo
 Perla Javate
 Jin Jiang
 Ignat Kaneff
 Leon Lee
 Fiona Macfarlane
 Mina Mawani
 Renan Orquiza
 Nasser Rad
 Minister Harjit Sajjan
 Fred Farhad Soofi
 Kumaran Thillaindarajah
 Avan Yu
 Félix Zogning

2015 
Recipients in 2015 include:

 Tikaram Adhikari
 Soheila Ansari
 Amrik Singh Aulakh
 Ulrike Bahr-Gedalia
 Henri Boyi
 John Chang
 Alice Chung
 Amanda Yeung Collucci
 Ver Cruz
 Bob Dhillon
 Dr. Qais Ghanem
 Sherif Guorgui
 John Iwaniura
 Susur Lee
 Dr. Tak Wah Mak
 Dr. Rosemary Moodie
 Shasha Navazesh
 Dr. Dhun Noria
 Umashanie Reddy
 Maria Nieves Santos-Greaves
 Thilak Tennekone
 Kim Thúy
 Vikram Vij
 Gezahgn Wordofa
 Ana María Zúniga

2014 
Recipients in 2014 include:

 Akram Al-Otumi
 Alan Diner
 Alberto Rodil
 Amit Chakma
 Anna Wolak
 Arlene Dickinson
 Dalal Al-Waheidi
 Farah Mohamed
 Gentil Misigaro
 Gradimir Pankov
 Ilse Treurnicht
 James Wang
 John Volken
 Julie Suen
 Manwar Khan
 Mobina Jaffer
 Nassreen Filsoof
 Naval Baja
 Peter Mielzynski
 Roberto Hausman
 Sarthak Sinha
 Senthi Chelliah
 Shala Chandani
 Dr. Surinder Singh Khurana
 Vivian Abboud

2013 
Recipients in 2013 include:

 Aleksandra Nasteska
 Aminata Sillah
 Anar Popatia
 Ginni Sethi
 Indira Samarasekera
 Izzeldin Abuelaish
 Dr. Jawahar (Jay) Kalra
 Leticia LaRosa
 Luis Guillermo Guerra
 Luisa Marshall
 Mamdouh Shoukri
 Michael Tulloch
 Narine Dat Sookram
 Rany Ibrahim
 Sara Eftekhar
 Sharifa Khan
 Sing Lim Yeo
 Srinivasan Suppiramaniam
 Steve Gupta
 Steve Nash
 Sukhdev Toor
 Sukhjit Singh
 Wen Wei Wang
 Winnie Wong
 Zahra Al-Harazi

2012 
Recipients in 2012 include:

 Francis Atta
 Kehar Singh Aujla
 Iman Biock Aghay
 Juan Carranza
 Olivia Chow
 Isabel Cisterna
 Meleni David
 Narima Dela Cruz
 Jagjit Singh Hans (Tiger Jeet Singh)
 Daniel Igali
 Commodore Hans Jung
 Suresh Kurl
 Peter Legge
 Tonny Louie
 Ahmed Mustaq
 Dr. Rey Pagtakhan
 Dr. Vivian Rambihar
 Zubeida Ramji
 Satish Thakkar
 Bing Thom
 Ai Thien Tran
 Madhu Verma
 Keinan "K'naan" Abdi Warsame
 Tonya Williams
 Nancy Zein

2011 
Recipients in 2011 include:

 Ahmed Abdullahi
 Leticia Adair
 Ari Asmar
 Jean Augustine
 Baljit Bawa
 Pinball Clemons
 Guilherme Dias
 Audrey D’Souza-Moraes
 Esa Para Esananda
 Karim Hakimi
 Robert Herjavec
 Alan Ho
 Toshi Jackson
 Mike Jang
 Mythili Kalyanasundaram
 Ihor Kozak
 Aditya Mohan
 Pyarali Nanji
 Gautam Nath
 Royson Ng
 Nick (Naeem) Noorani
 Victor Oh
 Alex Sangha
Zulima Wesso

2010 
Recipients in 2010 include:

 Donovan Bailey
 Raffi Cavoukian
 Vasdev Chanchlani
 Dr. Jagessar Das
 Rafael Fabregas
 John Furlong
 Charan Gill
 Ian Hanomansing
 Maggie Ip
 Sultan Jessa
 Aditya Jha
 Vinod Karna
 David Lin
 Dr. Joyce Madigane
 Hadi-Khan Mahabadi
 Dr. Lalita Malhotra
 Vivienne Poy
 Sumith Priyashantha
 Balwant Sanghera
 Vijay Sappani
 Dr. Asha Seth
 Fulvia Fadigas de Souza
 Yasuko Tanaka
 Parag Tandon
 Suchart Yodkerepauprai

2009 
Recipients in 2009 include:

 Girish Agrawal
 Dr. Birinder Singh
Ahluwalia
 Naseer Ahmad
 Francis Amara
 James Atebe
 Elaine Chan
 Chia-yi Chua
 Adrienne Clarkson
 Baltej Singh Dhillon
 Narinder Dhir
 Ujjal Dosanjh
 John Halani
 Michaelle Jean
 Deepa Mehta
 Rossbina Nathoo
 Body Ngoy
 Martha Lucia Nino
 Dr. Colin Saldanha
 Terry Sawh
 Dr. Lorelei and
Dr. Rosalind Silverman
 Hari Varshney
 Marcello Veiga
 Anupama Vittal
 Wendy Yuan

References

External links 
 

Canadian awards
Immigration to Canada